The 7th constituency of Bouches-du-Rhône is a French legislative constituency in Bouches-du-Rhône.

Deputies

Elections

2022

 
 
 
 
 
 
 
 
|-
| colspan="8" bgcolor="#E9E9E9"|
|-

2017

2012

|- style="background-color:#E9E9E9;text-align:center;"
! colspan="2" rowspan="2" style="text-align:left;" | Candidate
! rowspan="2" colspan="2" style="text-align:left;" | Party
! colspan="2" | 1st round
! colspan="2" | 2nd round
|- style="background-color:#E9E9E9;text-align:center;"
! width="75" | Votes
! width="30" | %
! width="75" | Votes
! width="30" | %
|-
| style="background-color:" |
| style="text-align:left;" | Henri Jibrayel
| style="text-align:left;" | Socialist Party
| PS
| 
| 27.51%
| 
| 62.34%
|-
| style="background-color:" |
| style="text-align:left;" | Bernard Marandat
| style="text-align:left;" | Front National
| FN
| 
| 23.69%
| 
| 37.66%
|-
| style="background-color:" |
| style="text-align:left;" | Karim Zeribi
| style="text-align:left;" | Europe Ecology – The Greens
| EELV
| 
| 21.53%
| colspan="2" style="text-align:left;" |
|-
| style="background-color:" |
| style="text-align:left;" | Jean-Marc Coppola
| style="text-align:left;" | Left Front
| FG
| 
| 11.62%
| colspan="2" style="text-align:left;" |
|-
| style="background-color:" |
| style="text-align:left;" | Sonia Leon
| style="text-align:left;" | New Centre-Presidential Majority
| NCE
| 
| 8.29%
| colspan="2" style="text-align:left;" |
|-
| style="background-color:" |
| style="text-align:left;" | Claude Nassur
| style="text-align:left;" | Miscellaneous Left
| DVG
| 
| 1.65%
| colspan="2" style="text-align:left;" |
|-
| style="background-color:" |
| style="text-align:left;" | Salim Laïbi
| style="text-align:left;" | Other
| AUT
| 
| 0.80%
| colspan="2" style="text-align:left;" |
|-
| style="background-color:" |
| style="text-align:left;" | Zoubida Meguenni
| style="text-align:left;" | Far Left
| EXG
| 
| 0.77%
| colspan="2" style="text-align:left;" |
|-
| style="background-color:" |
| style="text-align:left;" | Nadia Maoudj
| style="text-align:left;" | Ecologist
| ECO
| 
| 0.71%
| colspan="2" style="text-align:left;" |
|-
| style="background-color:" |
| style="text-align:left;" | Michèle Carayon
| style="text-align:left;" | Far Right
| EXD
| 
| 0.66%
| colspan="2" style="text-align:left;" |
|-
| style="background-color:" |
| style="text-align:left;" | Eddy Camilleri
| style="text-align:left;" | Other
| AUT
| 
| 0.50%
| colspan="2" style="text-align:left;" |
|-
| style="background-color:" |
| style="text-align:left;" | Michèle Latil
| style="text-align:left;" | 
| CEN
| 
| 0.48%
| colspan="2" style="text-align:left;" |
|-
| style="background-color:" |
| style="text-align:left;" | Danièle Pecout
| style="text-align:left;" | Far Left
| EXG
| 
| 0.46%
| colspan="2" style="text-align:left;" |
|-
| style="background-color:" |
| style="text-align:left;" | Pierre Bonnet
| style="text-align:left;" | Miscellaneous Left
| DVG
| 
| 0.32%
| colspan="2" style="text-align:left;" |
|-
| style="background-color:" |
| style="text-align:left;" | Mourad Goual
| style="text-align:left;" | Miscellaneous Right
| DVD
| 
| 0.31%
| colspan="2" style="text-align:left;" |
|-
| style="background-color:" |
| style="text-align:left;" | Ayette Boudelaa
| style="text-align:left;" | Ecologist
| ECO
| 
| 0.25%
| colspan="2" style="text-align:left;" |
|-
| style="background-color:" |
| style="text-align:left;" | Claire Aymes
| style="text-align:left;" | Miscellaneous Right
| DVD
| 
| 0.23%
| colspan="2" style="text-align:left;" |
|-
| style="background-color:" |
| style="text-align:left;" | Chérif Fahem
| style="text-align:left;" | Miscellaneous Left
| DVG
| 
| 0.21%
| colspan="2" style="text-align:left;" |
|-
| style="background-color:" |
| style="text-align:left;" | Madga Hadji
| style="text-align:left;" | Miscellaneous Left
| DVG
| 
| 0.00%
| colspan="2" style="text-align:left;" |
|-
| style="background-color:" |
| style="text-align:left;" | Nabil Kadri
| style="text-align:left;" | Radical Party of the Left
| PRG
| 
| 0.00%
| colspan="2" style="text-align:left;" |
|-
| colspan="8" style="background-color:#E9E9E9;"|
|- style="font-weight:bold"
| colspan="4" style="text-align:left;" | Total
| 
| 100%
| 
| 100%
|-
| colspan="8" style="background-color:#E9E9E9;"|
|-
| colspan="4" style="text-align:left;" | Registered voters
| 
| style="background-color:#E9E9E9;"|
| 
| style="background-color:#E9E9E9;"|
|-
| colspan="4" style="text-align:left;" | Blank/Void ballots
| 
| 1.57%
| 
| 4.30%
|-
| colspan="4" style="text-align:left;" | Turnout
| 
| 48.25%
| 
| 45.27%
|-
| colspan="4" style="text-align:left;" | Abstentions
| 
| 51.75%
| 
| 54.73%
|-
| colspan="8" style="background-color:#E9E9E9;"|
|- style="font-weight:bold"
| colspan="6" style="text-align:left;" | Result
| colspan="2" style="background-color:" | PS HOLD
|}

2007

|- style="background-color:#E9E9E9;text-align:center;"
! colspan="2" rowspan="2" style="text-align:left;" | Candidate
! rowspan="2" colspan="2" style="text-align:left;" | Party
! colspan="2" | 1st round
! colspan="2" | 2nd round
|- style="background-color:#E9E9E9;text-align:center;"
! width="75" | Votes
! width="30" | %
! width="75" | Votes
! width="30" | %
|-
| style="background-color:" |
| style="text-align:left;" | Sylvie Andrieux
| style="text-align:left;" | Socialist Party
| PS
| 
| 38.59%
| 
| 57.79%
|-
| style="background-color:" |
| style="text-align:left;" | Nora Remadnia Preziosi
| style="text-align:left;" | Union for a Popular Movement
| UMP
| 
| 30.34%
| 
| 42.21%
|-
| style="background-color:" |
| style="text-align:left;" | Stéphane Ravier
| style="text-align:left;" | Front National
| FN
| 
| 11.83%
| colspan="2" style="text-align:left;" |
|-
| style="background-color:" |
| style="text-align:left;" | Haouaria Hadj Chikh
| style="text-align:left;" | Communist
| PCF
| 
| 5.30%
| colspan="2" style="text-align:left;" |
|-
| style="background-color:" |
| style="text-align:left;" | Mohamed Laqhila
| style="text-align:left;" | Democratic Movement
| MoDem
| 
| 3.74%
| colspan="2" style="text-align:left;" |
|-
| style="background-color:" |
| style="text-align:left;" | Camille Roux
| style="text-align:left;" | Far Left
| EXG
| 
| 1.96%
| colspan="2" style="text-align:left;" |
|-
| style="background-color:" |
| style="text-align:left;" | Nicole Cantrel
| style="text-align:left;" | Movement for France
| MPF
| 
| 1.77%
| colspan="2" style="text-align:left;" |
|-
| style="background-color:" |
| style="text-align:left;" | Claude Nassur
| style="text-align:left;" | Miscellaneous Left
| DVG
| 
| 1.28%
| colspan="2" style="text-align:left;" |
|-
| style="background-color:" |
| style="text-align:left;" | Flora Boulay
| style="text-align:left;" | The Greens
| VEC
| 
| 1.27%
| colspan="2" style="text-align:left;" |
|-
| style="background-color:" |
| style="text-align:left;" | Alain Vauzelle
| style="text-align:left;" | Far Right
| EXD
| 
| 1.14%
| colspan="2" style="text-align:left;" |
|-
| style="background-color:" |
| style="text-align:left;" | Josiane Giordano
| style="text-align:left;" | Ecologist
| ECO
| 
| 0.78%
| colspan="2" style="text-align:left;" |
|-
| style="background-color:" |
| style="text-align:left;" | Hassan Benamar
| style="text-align:left;" | Miscellaneous Right
| DVD
| 
| 0.71%
| colspan="2" style="text-align:left;" |
|-
| style="background-color:" |
| style="text-align:left;" | Danièle Pecout
| style="text-align:left;" | Far Left
| EXG
| 
| 0.64%
| colspan="2" style="text-align:left;" |
|-
| style="background-color:" |
| style="text-align:left;" | Aimé Guenoun
| style="text-align:left;" | Ecologist
| ECO
| 
| 0.39%
| colspan="2" style="text-align:left;" |
|-
| style="background-color:" |
| style="text-align:left;" | Isabelle Kurbetz
| style="text-align:left;" | Independent
| DIV
| 
| 0.25%
| colspan="2" style="text-align:left;" |
|-
| colspan="8" style="background-color:#E9E9E9;"|
|- style="font-weight:bold"
| colspan="4" style="text-align:left;" | Total
| 
| 100%
| 
| 100%
|-
| colspan="8" style="background-color:#E9E9E9;"|
|-
| colspan="4" style="text-align:left;" | Registered voters
| 
| style="background-color:#E9E9E9;"|
| 
| style="background-color:#E9E9E9;"|
|-
| colspan="4" style="text-align:left;" | Blank/Void ballots
| 
| 1.83%
| 
| 2.99%
|-
| colspan="4" style="text-align:left;" | Turnout
| 
| 50.74%
| 
| 50.99%
|-
| colspan="4" style="text-align:left;" | Abstentions
| 
| 49.26%
| 
| 49.01%
|-
| colspan="8" style="background-color:#E9E9E9;"|
|- style="font-weight:bold"
| colspan="6" style="text-align:left;" | Result
| colspan="2" style="background-color:" | PS HOLD
|}

2002

 
 
 
 
 
 
|-
| colspan="8" bgcolor="#E9E9E9"|
|-

1997

 
 
 
 
 
 
|-
| colspan="8" bgcolor="#E9E9E9"|
|-

References

7